Leroy "Lee" Winfield (February 4, 1947 – February 4, 2011) was an American professional basketball player.

A 6'2" guard from North Texas State University, Winfield played in the National Basketball Association from 1969 to 1976 as a member of the Seattle SuperSonics, Buffalo Braves, and Kansas City Kings.  His most productive seasons came in 1970–71 and 1971–72 when he averaged more than 10 points a game with Seattle.  He was also a member of the Braves' 1974 and 1975 playoff teams.  He averaged 7.3 points per game in his professional career.

Winfield later worked as an assistant coach at Saint Louis University, the University of Missouri, and St. Louis Community College.

He died on his 64th birthday after a battle with colon cancer.

Notes

1947 births
2011 deaths
African-American basketball players
American men's basketball coaches
American men's basketball players
Basketball coaches from Missouri
Basketball players from St. Louis
Buffalo Braves players
Junior college men's basketball players in the United States
Kansas City Kings players
Missouri Tigers men's basketball coaches
North Texas Mean Green men's basketball players
Point guards
Saint Louis Billikens men's basketball coaches
Seattle SuperSonics draft picks
Seattle SuperSonics players
Deaths from cancer in Missouri
Deaths from colorectal cancer
20th-century African-American sportspeople
21st-century African-American people